Thomas Donaldson may refer to:
 Thomas Donaldson (ethicist), business ethics professor
 Thomas Donaldson (cricketer) (1882– 1960), English cricketer
 Thomas K. Donaldson (1944–2006), cryonics advocate
 Thomas Leverton Donaldson (1795–1885), British architect
 Thomas Quinton Donaldson Jr. (1864–1934), United States Army officer

See also
 Donaldson